Ochocinco: The Ultimate Catch is an American reality television series airing on VH1 starring wide receiver Chad Ochocinco. The show places him with 85 women to choose from to find love. In the first episode of the show, he eliminated 69 girls. Rubi Pazmino was the winner of the show. Fellow NFL Wide Receivers, and Ochocinco's close friends, Bernard "B-Twice" Berrian and Terrell Owens appeared on some episodes offering tips and helping Ochocinco select the girls.

Contestants

In Episode 4, Lisa withdrew the competition to tend to her grandfather, who is terminally ill with cancer.

Episode Progress

 The contestant was Chad's Top Player.
 The contestant is Chad's Ultimate Catch.
 The contestant won the date and was safe.
 The contestant was automatically safe.
 The contestant was eliminated.
 The contestant left the show.

In episode 1, Chad ranked the girls 1-16 to set them up in a tournament style bracket.
In episode 5, Chad eliminated both April and Laurice and kept both Tiphani and Brittany.  Chad placed Brittany to compete with Jasmine in the second round.
In episode 8, Chad did not eliminate any girl, taking all four of them to Miami.
In episode 9, Chad eliminated Tara outside of elimination because she failed to be serious. Brittany was automatically moved to the Championship

Episodes

References

External links

VH1 original programming
American television spin-offs
2010 American television series debuts
2010s American reality television series
American dating and relationship reality television series
English-language television shows
2010 American television series endings
Television series by 51 Minds Entertainment
Television shows shot in the Las Vegas Valley
Television shows filmed in California
Television shows filmed in Ohio
Television shows filmed in Florida